Johannes Cornelis Wienecke (Heiligenstadt, 24 March 1872 - Apeldoorn, 11 August 1945) was a Dutch medallist. He designed the 4th portrait of queen Wilhelmina used on Dutch coins between 1922 and 1945. He worked many years in Zeist. In 1922 he also designed the logo of the Permanent Court of International Justice, which continues to be used today by the International Court of Justice.

Works

References

1872 births
1945 deaths
Dutch currency designers
People from Heilbad Heiligenstadt
People from Zeist